Ronald Baker (born November 19, 1954) is a former American football offensive lineman in the National Football League for the Baltimore Colts and the Philadelphia Eagles.  He played college football at Oklahoma State University and was drafted in the tenth round of the 1977 NFL Draft.

References

1954 births
Living people
American football offensive linemen
Baltimore Colts players
Oklahoma State Cowboys football players
Philadelphia Eagles players
Players of American football from Gary, Indiana